Adrian Sylvester Littlejohn (born 26 September 1970) is an English former footballer who played as a midfielder and a striker. He scored 74 goals in 425 league appearances in an 18-year career in the English Football League.

He began his professional career at Walsall, after moving from West Bromwich Albion in 1989. He moved on to Sheffield United two years later, before making a £100,000 move to Plymouth Argyle in September 1995. He helped Plymouth to win promotion out of the Third Division in 1996, before moving on to Oldham Athletic in March 1998. Eight months later he was sold on to Bury for £75,000. He returned to Sheffield United in October 2001, before transferring to Port Vale in February 2003. In August 2004 he switched to Lincoln City, before ending the season at Rushden & Diamonds. In September 2005 he signed with Mansfield Town before moving on to non-league club Leek Town the following year. He retired in 2008 following a brief spell at Retford United.

Playing career

Walsall
Littlejohn started his footballing career at West Bromwich Albion, but failed to play a match and was released at the end of the 1988–89 season to find first team football elsewhere. He did though win six caps for the England U16 team. He stayed in his native West Midlands and joined Walsall prior to the 1989–90 season; the "Saddlers" finished bottom of the Third Division under John Barnwell's stewardship and were relegated into the Fourth Division. They then finished a disappointing 16th in 1990–91 under Kenny Hibbitt. Littlejohn played 54 games, scoring one goal, in his two seasons with the club.

Sheffield United
Prior to the 1991–92 season, Littlejohn was signed by Dave Bassett of Sheffield United. He played a part in the "Blades" first ever Premier League season in 1992–93, scoring eight goals in 27 games. He scored three goals in 19 top-flight games in 1993–94, as United were relegated into the First Division. He appeared just 18 times in 1994–95, before he moved to Plymouth Argyle for a £100,000 fee in September 1995.

Plymouth Argyle
Bagging 18 goals, he was the club's top scorer in his debut season at Home Park, which helped Plymouth finish fourth in the Third Division. They were just one point short of automatic promotion, but managed to gain promotion via the play-offs with a 1–0 win over Darlington. The 1996–97 and 1997–98 seasons saw the club involved in relegation battles; Littlejohn had escaped the cycle however, joining Second Division side Oldham Athletic in March 1998.

Oldham Athletic to Bury
At Oldham he joined Neil Warnock, the manager who had signed him at Plymouth. Littlejohn scored his début against Watford, however both men's stay at Boundary Park was brief; Bury appointed Warnock manager in May 1998, and six months later he bought Littlejohn for £75,000. The "Shakers" occupied the final relegation place in the First Division in 1998–99, finishing behind Port Vale on goals scored. They finished 15th in 1999–2000 under new boss Andy Preece, with Littlejohn scoring 10 times in his 48 appearances. He scored five goals in 43 games for the Gigg Lane club in 2000–01, and in total scored 16 goals in 112 games in close to three seasons at the club.

Sheffield United to Port Vale
In December 1999, Warnock was made manager of Sheffield United and in October 2001 he brought Littlejohn back to the club, on a non-contract basis. He remained loyal to Warnock, refusing to sign a permanent contract with Carlisle United, though he was to only play three competitive matches for the first team in 2001–02, two of those coming from off the bench. Leaving the club in February 2003 he rejected the chance to sign with Bradford City, and instead signed with Port Vale. After impressing manager Brian Horton, his initial one-month deal was extended to the end of the season. He then went on to score seven goals in 41 appearances in the 2003–04 campaign.

Later career
In August 2004 he put pen to paper with League Two side Lincoln City. Failing to make at impact at Sincil Bank, he was released by manager Keith Alexander in January 2005. He then joined Rushden & Diamonds on a contract expiring at the end of the season. The ageing striker made fifteen appearances for the club and also gave the younger players the benefit of his experience. In September 2005 he signed with Mansfield Town, making seven substitute appearances in the league over the course of the 2005–06 season for Peter Shirtliff's "Stags". He wound his career down with a few games for non-league Leek Town, playing for the club from March to October in 2006. In June 2007, Littlejohn agreed to return to playing at Retford United for his old teammate Peter Duffield, before leaving the club at the end of the season.

Coaching career
Towards the end of his playing days, Littlejohn began working at the Sheffield United academy. Littlejohn ventured into physiotherapy in 2014, and took up a position as academy physiotherapist at Rotherham United. By September 2019, he was working as Cardiff City's first-team physio.

Career statistics
Source:

Honours
Plymouth Argyle
Football League Third Division play-offs: 1996

References

1970 births
Living people
Footballers from Wolverhampton
English footballers
England youth international footballers
Association football midfielders
Association football forwards
Black British sportsmen
West Bromwich Albion F.C. players
Walsall F.C. players
Sheffield United F.C. players
Plymouth Argyle F.C. players
Oldham Athletic A.F.C. players
Bury F.C. players
Port Vale F.C. players
Lincoln City F.C. players
Rushden & Diamonds F.C. players
Mansfield Town F.C. players
Leek Town F.C. players
Retford United F.C. players
Premier League players
English Football League players
Northern Premier League players
Sheffield United F.C. non-playing staff
Rotherham United F.C. non-playing staff
Cardiff City F.C. non-playing staff
Association football coaches
Association football physiotherapists